Charles Alexander Wallis (born 14 October 1991) is an English former first-class cricketer.

Wallis was born at Westminster in October 1991. He was educated at Radley College, before going up to Hatfield College, Durham. While studying at Durham, he made four appearances in first-class cricket for Durham MCCU, playing twice in 2012 against Middlesex and Durham and twice in 2013 against Durham and Nottinghamshire. Playing as a right-arm medium pace bowler, he took 5 wickets in his four matches at an expensive average of 101.20, with best figures of 2 for 63.

References

External links

1991 births
Living people
People from Westminster
People educated at Radley College
Alumni of Hatfield College, Durham
English cricketers
Durham MCCU cricketers